Marcello Fonte is an Italian actor. He received the Cannes Film Festival Award for Best Actor for his role in the film Dogman.

Early life and education 
Fonte lived his childhood and adolescence in the suburbs of Reggio Calabria, where at the age of 10 he learned to play the snare drum in the town's band. He then moved to Rome in 1999, where he worked as guardian at the Teatro Valle. Here he became passionate about acting, and was given small parts in television and film productions.

Accolades and awards 
In 2018, Fonte received critical acclaim for his performance in Matteo Garrone's Dogman and was awarded the Best Actor Award at the 2018 Cannes Film Festival. He was also awarded the European Film Award for Best Actor at the 31st European Film Awards for his performance in this film.

Partial filmography

Film
 Unfair Competition (2001)
 The Order (2003)
 Blood of the Losers (2008)
 Heavenly Body (2011)
 Asino vola (2015)
 Dogman (2018)
 Io sono Tempesta (2018)
 Pinocchio (2019)
 Vivere (2019)
 The New Gospel (2020)
 Il sesso degli angeli (2022)

TV
 Stracult (2001)
 Don Matteo (2001)
 Diritto di difesa (2004)
 The Mafia Kills Only in Summer (2016)
 I Know This Much Is True (2020)

References

External links
 

1978 births
20th-century Italian male actors
21st-century Italian male actors
Living people
Italian male film actors
Cannes Film Festival Award for Best Actor winners
European Film Award for Best Actor winners